Acacia diallaga is a shrub belonging to the genus Acacia and the subgenus Juliflorae that is endemic to Western Australia.

Description
It has glabrous and lenticellular obscurely ribbed branchlets. Like most species of Acacia it has phyllodes rather than true leaves. The glabrous, rigid, green to grey-green to blue-green phyllodes have a narrowly elliptic to oblong-elliptic or somewhat lanceolate shape are a little asymmetric. The phyllodes change colour to a purple red colour in times of drought and revert to the regular colour following rains.

Distribution
It is native to a small area in the Wheatbelt region of Western Australia around Perenjori. near Karara and Warriedar Stations to the east of Morawa where it is often situated on slopes or crests of low rocky hills growing in skeletal soils as a part of Allocasuarina or Acacia shrubland communities.

See also
List of Acacia species

References

diallaga
Acacias of Western Australia
Plants described in 2008
Taxa named by Bruce Maslin